Manja Kowalski (born 25 January 1976 in Potsdam) is a German rower. She is the twin sister of Kerstin Kowalski.

References

External links
 

1976 births
Living people
German female rowers
Sportspeople from Potsdam
Olympic rowers of Germany
Rowers at the 2000 Summer Olympics
Olympic gold medalists for Germany
Olympic medalists in rowing
World Rowing Championships medalists for Germany
Medalists at the 2000 Summer Olympics
Twin sportspeople